Cruise is an unincorporated community in Laurel County, Kentucky, United States.

The community was named for an early settler and entrepreneur of the same name.  A post office was established in 1899 with Welcom Mullins as its first postmaster.

References

Unincorporated communities in Laurel County, Kentucky
Unincorporated communities in Kentucky